5-Methoxy-N,N-diisopropyltryptamine (5-MeO-DiPT, sometimes called foxy methoxy or simply foxy) is a psychedelic tryptamine and the methoxy derivative of diisopropyltryptamine (DiPT).

Pharmacology
The mechanism that produces the purported hallucinogenic and entheogenic effects of 5-MeO-DiPT is thought to result primarily from 5-HT2A receptor agonism, although additional mechanisms of action such as monoamine oxidase inhibition (MAOI) may be involved also. The strongest receptor binding affinity for 5-MeO-DiPT is at the 5-HT1A receptor.

5-MeO-DiPT is neurotoxic in rats.

Overdose
Excessive doses have caused clinical intoxication, characterized by nausea, vomiting, agitation, hypotension, mydriasis, tachycardia and hallucinations, in a number of young adults. A number of these overdoses are attributed to the drug’s extended onset of action, where first time users, who were unfamiliar with the drug, administered a second dose after initially feeling no effects.   Rhabdomyolysis and renal failure occurred in one young man and another one died 3–4 hours after an  apparent rectal overdose. At least one death has been attributed to consumption of 5-MeO-DiPT.

Drug prohibition laws

China

As of October 2015 5-MeO-DiPT is a controlled substance in China.

Denmark
Illegal since February 2004.

Germany
Illegal since September 1999.

Greece
Illegal since February 2003.

Japan
Illegal since April 2005.

Singapore
Illegal since early 2006.

Sweden
Sveriges riksdags health ministry Statens folkhälsoinstitut classified 5-MeO-DiPT as "health hazard" under the act Lagen om förbud mot vissa hälsofarliga varor (translated Act on the Prohibition of Certain Goods Dangerous to Health) as of Oct 1, 2004,  in their regulation SFS 2004:696 listed as 5-metoxi-N,N-diisopropyltryptamin (5-MeO-DIPT), making it illegal to sell or possess.

United States
On April 4, 2003, the United States DEA added both 5-MeO-DiPT and alpha-methyltryptamine (AMT) to Schedule I of the Controlled Substances Act under "emergency scheduling" procedures. The drugs were officially placed into Schedule I on September 29, 2004. Prior to its prohibition in the U.S., 5-MeO-DiPT was sold online alongside psychoactive analogues such as DiPT, and DPT, neither of which have yet been expressly outlawed.

See also 
 5-MeO-DiBF
 5-MeO-DMT
 5-MeO-DPT
 5-MeO-AMT
 5-MeO-MiPT
 DMT
 DPT
 AMT
 DIPT
 MIPT

References

External links 
 Official Ruling Placing 5-MeO-DIPT into Schedule I
 Erowid information on 5-MeO-DIPT.
 5-MeO-DIPT entry in TiHKAL • info

Designer drugs
Phenol ethers
Psychedelic tryptamines
Serotonin receptor agonists
Neurotoxins
Diisopropylamino compounds
Methoxy compounds